"Time Don't Run Out on Me" is a song written by Gerry Goffin and Carole King, and recorded by Canadian country music artist Anne Murray.  It was released in January 1985 as the second single from the Gold-selling album Heart Over Mind.

The track hit #1 on the RPM Country Tracks chart in Canada in April 1985. and also reached at #2 on the Billboard Hot Country Singles chart in the United States.

The song also appears on Murray's 2007 album Anne Murray Duets: Friends & Legends, performed as a duet with the song's co-composer, Carole King.

Charts

Weekly charts

Year-end charts

References

1985 singles
1984 songs
Anne Murray songs
Songs written by Carole King
Songs with lyrics by Gerry Goffin
Song recordings produced by Jim Ed Norman
Capitol Records singles